Aria Summer Wallace (born November 3, 1996) is an American singer, songwriter and actress. She is known for her guest role as Amanda "Mandy" Valdez on the Nickelodeon sitcom iCarly and for her role as Roxy Hunter in the four Nickelodeon Original Movies of the same name.

Life and career 
Aria Summer Wallace was born in Atlanta, Georgia, on November 3, 1996.

In 2002, she made her television debut in the show The Bernie Mac Show, as Lara. On June 17, 2005, Wallace made her film debut in the movie The Perfect Man, as Zoe Hamilton, alongside Hilary Duff, who played Zoe's sister Holly, and Heather Locklear who played Zoe's and Holly's mother Jean. She also guest starred on the Nickelodeon television show iCarly, portraying Mandy, an obsessed fan. Wallace continues to perform in multiple facets, including theater performances and making music.

Filmography

References

External links
 

1996 births
21st-century American actresses
21st-century American women singers
Actresses from Atlanta
American child actresses
American child singers
American film actresses
American television actresses
Living people
Musicians from Atlanta
Singers from Georgia (U.S. state)
21st-century American singers